Sericomyia silentis, is a species of hoverfly. It is widespread throughout the Palearctic but normally encountered in small numbers in mountain regions and moorland and bog locations.

Description
External images For terms see Morphology of Diptera
Wing length 9 ·5–14 mm. Pregenital segment yellow. Legs yellowish, base of femorae black. Tergites 2-4 dark yellow side-stripes widen towards tergite margins.
See references for determination

Distribution
Palearctic Fennoscandia South to the Pyrenees. Ireland East through North Europe and Central Europe (Alps) into Russia and the Caucasus and on to Siberia, the Russian Far East and Japan.

Biology
Habitat: wet moorland, valley bog, fen and Alnus, Salix carr.
Flies May to October.

References

Diptera of Europe
Eristalinae
Insects described in 1776
Articles containing video clips
Taxa named by Moses Harris